The gens Tarutilia was an obscure plebeian family at ancient Rome.  No members of this gens are mentioned in history, but several are known from inscriptions.

Origin

Members

 Tarutilius, named in a bone inscription from an uncertain location, dated the nones of October, 77 BC.
 Tarutilius, mentioned in a portion of the Fasti Praenestini immediately following the Larentalia, for which he apparently left a large testamentary donation.
 Aulus Tarutilius, the former master of Aulus Tarutilius Philomusus.
 Aulus Tarutilius A. l. Philomusus, a freedman buried at Rome, some time between the middle of the first century BC, and the first century AD.
 Lucius Tarutilius, the former master of Lucius Tarutilius Saturninus.
 Lucius Tarutilius L. l. Saturninus, a freed child buried at Rome during the first half of the first century, aged two years, four months.

See also
 List of Roman gentes

References

Bibliography
 Dictionary of Greek and Roman Biography and Mythology, William Smith, ed., Little, Brown and Company, Boston (1849).
 Theodor Mommsen et alii, Corpus Inscriptionum Latinarum (The Body of Latin Inscriptions, abbreviated CIL), Berlin-Brandenburgische Akademie der Wissenschaften (1853–present).
 René Cagnat et alii, L'Année épigraphique (The Year in Epigraphy, abbreviated AE), Presses Universitaires de France (1888–present).
 George Davis Chase, "The Origin of Roman Praenomina", in Harvard Studies in Classical Philology, vol. VIII, pp. 103–184 (1897).

Roman gentes